Jacob Two Two Meets The Hooded Fang is a 1999 film adaptation of the novel of the same name by Mordecai Richler.

Synopsis
This humorous children's story recounts the adventure of a young boy who strives to be heard. As The Globe and Mail writer James Bradshaw writes, Jacob Two-Two is "two plus two plus two years old, has two brothers and two sisters, and has to say everything twice just to be heard; odd numbers aren't his thing." This quirk gives rise to his nickname "Two-Two". One day, he decides to buy the groceries for his parents, where he says, typically for Two-Two: "I want two pounds of firm, ripe tomatoes. I want two pounds of firm, ripe tomatoes." Misunderstanding Jacob, the clerk threatens to have him arrested for "insulting a grown-up"; Jacob runs from the store and eventually finds himself in court. He is sentenced to two years, two months, two weeks and two minutes by the judge (Ice-T) in the Children's Prison hundreds of miles away from civilization. His place of punishment is a dark, dirty dungeon-like place where the children work and are kept in cells. There are the three head characters, Master Fish, a fish/human, Mistress Fowl, a bird-like woman and the Hooded Fang himself. They also have green henchmen who spray "slime resistors" at the children to prevent them escaping. Two child agents try to help him out, as the children also devise a plan for escape.

Critical reaction
Writing for Variety, Brendan Kelly suggests that while the opening of the film is funny, at least some of the material may not hold children's attention: "This dark, edgy kids’ fantasy may not have enough light action to keep the grade-schoolers amused. Sophisticated and largely intriguing, modern-day fairy tale centers on a six-year-old boy’s nightmare of life in a prison for kids. Helmer George Bloomfield and scripter Tim Burns have crafted a haunting, funny take on kids’ anxieties. But the acting is uneven, the pacing not fast enough for young attention spans, and the material may simply be too downbeat to click with the under-ten set."

Rotten Tomatoes reviewer Lafe Fredbjornson panned the 1999 film version as being a "not very good" adaptation of the book: "Because of how perfect the 1977 film was, this one's flaws stuck out. The kid playing Jacob Two-Two was pretty generic and lacked character. The Ice-T rap-session in the courtroom didn't seem to fit. Gary Busey as the Hooded Fang was scary for all the wrong reasons. Mark McKinney and Miranda Richardson seemed like standup comics in animal costumes. The prison set didn't feel like the one described in the book. The songs were dreadful."

Cast 
Gary Busey ...  The Hooded Fang 
Mark McKinney ...  Mr. Fish 
Miranda Richardson ...  Miss Fowl 
Max Morrow ...  Jacob Two Two 
Ice-T ...  Justice Rough, The Judge 
Maury Chaykin ...  Mr. Cooper/Louie Loser 
Joe Dinicol ...  O'Toole/Noah 
Alison Pill ...  Shapiro/Emma
Emma Bambrick ...  Shelly 
Jake Goldsbie ...  Oscar
Shawn Roberts ... Daniel
Lauren Harlow... extra

References

External links 

CBC Television original films
English-language Canadian films
1999 films
Films based on Canadian novels
Films based on works by Mordecai Richler
Canadian children's fantasy films
Films directed by George Bloomfield
1990s English-language films
1990s Canadian films